The 2004 Georgia Democratic presidential primary was held on March 2 in the U.S. state of Georgia as one of the Democratic Party's statewide nomination contests ahead of the 2004 presidential election.

Results

References 

Georgia
Democratic primary
2004